Chandigarh University  (CU) is a private university located in Mohali, Punjab, India.The university was established on 10 July 2012 by an act of Punjab State Legislature. It is recognized by University Grants Commission under Section 2(f) with the right to confer degrees as per Section 22(1) of the UGC Act, 1956. Chandigarh University has been accredited 'A+' by NAAC in 2019.

Academics 
Chandigarh University offers undergraduate, post-graduate and doctorate degrees in various disciplines including engineering, management, computing, cognitive sciences, education, animation and multimedia, tourism, pharma sciences, biotechnology, architecture, commerce, legal studies, agricultural science, media studies, liberal arts and basic sciences.

The university offers more than 200 programmes

Rankings 

The National Institutional Ranking Framework has ranked Chandigarh University 48 in the overall rankings, 29 in the universities rankings, 45 in the engineering category, 40 in the management category, 37 in the pharmacy category, and 19 in the architecture category, as per the rankings released in July 2022.

The university has been ranked #271-280 under QS Asia Rankings in 2022 and 185 in 2023 QS Asia Rankings and rated Diamond by QS IGAUGE.

Recognitions 
Chandigarh University is recognized by the University Grants Commission (UGC). There are also courses which are also approved by the All India Council for Technical Education (AICTE), National Council for Hotel Management and Catering Technology (NCHMCT), Bar Council of India (BCI), Pharmacy Council of India (PCI), Council of Architecture (COA), National Council for Teacher Education (NCTE), member of Association of Indian Universities (AIU), member of Computer Society of India (CSI), member of International Association of Universities (IAU), member of Association of Commonwealth Universities (ACU), member of Institute of Electrical and Electronics Engineers (IEEE), member of The American Society of Mechanical Engineers (ASME) and member of American Chemical Society (ACS).

Accreditation 
National Assessment and Accreditation Council (NAAC) A+

Memberships 
International Association of Universities

Institutes 

Chandigarh University includes the institutes of Engineering, Business, Computing, Pharma Sciences, Liberal Arts & Humanities, Tourism & Hospitality Management, and Applied Health Sciences, among others.

References

External links
 

Private universities in India
Universities in Punjab, India
Education in Mohali
Educational institutions established in 2012
2012 establishments in Punjab, India